Lake Mistassini is the largest natural lake by surface area in the province of Quebec, Canada, with a total surface area of approximately  and a net area (water surface area only) of . The Cree town of Mistissini is located on Watson Peninsula in the south-east corner of the lake, which separates Baie du Poste from Abatagouche Bay.
Extensive forests of spruce, birch, pine, and fir trees, which support a booming forestry industry, surround the lake.

Significant tributaries flowing into the lake include: Chalifour, Pépeshquasati, Takwa, Témiscamie, and Wabissinane.

Other nearby lakes include Lake Albanel and Lake Troilus.

Etymology 

Over the centuries, it went through many name changes and different spellings. In 1664, on a map by Ducreux, this lake was known as Outakgami. On maps by Jolliet (1684), Jaillot (1685) and Franquelin (1688), the lake was identified as Timagaming. In 1703, the cartographer Guillaume Delisle used the same name, along with the name Mistasin. Laure (1731) and Bellin (1744) showed on their maps the name Lake Mistassins.  Other spelling variations of this First Nations designation included: Mistacinnee, Mistacsinney, Mistasinne, Mistasinia, etc.

In 1808, James McKenzie of the North West Company used the name Lake Mistassini in his writings, the first use of the name in its current form. Nevertheless, other variants persisted long after: for instance, the explorer James Clouston inscribed Mistassinnie in his diary of 1820, while the geologist Robert Bell mentioned in 1880 the name Misstissinny. Yet, thereafter, Mistassini became the accepted form, as evidenced by the map of the province of Quebec drawn in 1880 by Taché, and the expedition report published by Albert Peter Low in 1885, and in his Annual Report of 1900, Bell also adopted the current spelling.

Pre-contact
In the summer of 1948 Rogers and Rogers found 121 prehistoric sites in the region about Lake Mistassini and Albanel. At site 33, a sandy bank 15 to 20 feet high, where the land in back of the banks was comparatively flat and dry, First Nations people in the area in 1948 claimed to have camped since time immemorial. At the time of Roger's research in 1948, First Nation people were actively still using campsites on 36% of the 121 prehistoric sites.

History
The existence of this large lake was known to French explorers prior to its official discovery; Samuel de Champlain knew of it in 1603. It was finally discovered by Europeans in 1663 as part of an expedition ordered by Governor D'Avaugour and led by Guillaume Couture (first settler of Pointe-Lévy (Lévis) and hero of New France). He was accompanied by Pierre Duquet and Jean Langlois, as well as by Native American guides; the whole group consisting of a fleet of 44 canoes. They went up the Saguenay River, reached Lake Mistassini and continued on the Rupert River which flows to the Hudson Bay.

Thereafter, Lake Mistassini became an important step along the route from the Saguenay to James Bay. In 1672, Charles Albanel crossed the lake in an official mission. On June 18, 1672, he wrote: "We entered the great Lake Mistassirinins [...]; this Lake is named for the rocks with which it abounds, which are of prodigious size." That same year, a fur trading post was established on the lake, the location of which shifted from time to time until 1821, when it was established at the present site of the village Mistissini.

Mistassini Cree camp leader Alfie Matoush allowed ethnographer Edwards Rogers and his wife to join Matoush's 13-member hunting group in 1953-4 in their traditional hunting territory in the eastern Subarctic. Rogers observed the variety of game and resources that the Matoush group exploited and noted that they were able to derive a high percentage of the goods necessary for their existence, which included an impressive variety of game and resources, sufficient to keep their health at a better level than other, more sedentary First Nation people who lived in hamlets. Their traditional hunting grounds, an area northeast of Lake Mistassini, were near the headwaters of the Eastmain River, and just south of Noakokan. Lake Indicator is near their southern boundary. Rogers observed that Lake Indicator was used as an early winter base for hunting and trapping, and noted the remains of an earth-covered conical lodge, four house pits, and a log cabin. Rogers noted that the Mistassini First Nations left their summer encampments in late August or early September at the lower end of Lake Mistassini and moved to their hunting grounds where the men built a fall camp. From October through December they lived in early winter camps which were more substantial. This was where they cached their canoes. During the hardest part of the winter they moved to different hunting camps. In April, they moved back to the early winter camp, and by the end of May they were at their summer camp at the south end of Lake Mistassini.

The earth-covered conical lodge, three house pits, and the remains of a log cabin were near the Matoush early winter camp (1953-1954), about mid-way on the west shore of Lake Indicator. The earth-covered conical lodge was used by Matoush's parents, his siblings, and his own family c. 1915-1920 as an early winter camp from October to January.

The known distribution of earth-covered conical lodges in the eastern Subarctic extends from the east coast of James Bay at the Eastman River post, the lower Rupert River, and Fort George.

Geography

Main islands 
(Clockwise, from the mouth)

Peninsulas, capes and bays

Access roads 
The eastern sector of Mistassini Lake (including the village of Mistissini (Cree village municipality) and the hamlet Rivière-Chalifour) is accessible from Chibougamau by the route 167. This road goes north to the east shore of Albanel Lake. Some secondary forest roads connect to this main road.

See also
List of lakes of Quebec
Cree Hunters of Mistassini
 Mistassini dike swarm

References

Works cited

External links

 

Mistassini
Cree